The Rosary usually refers to the Catholic Marian devotional prayers.

It may also refer to:
 A rosary, the prayer beads themselves
 Other rosary-based prayers in Christian contexts
 Similar devotional prayers in other denominations and faiths
 Rosary, a coin minted in Europe as a counterfeit form of the sterling silver penny of Edward I
 Rosary Lakes, a group of lakes in Oregon
 The Rosary (disambiguation)